The Battle of Jarrab was a territorial battle between the Al Saud and their traditional enemies, the Al Rashid on 24 January 1915. It was a proxy battle of World War I between the British-supported Saudis and the Ottoman-supported Rashidis.

Rashidi forces led by young Saud bin Abdulaziz Al Rashid defeated the forces of Ibn Saud. The main significance of the battle was the death of Ibn Saud's British Military Advisor, Captain William Shakespear. The reason for the defeat of Ibn Saud's forces is given by both Arabic and British sources as the withdrawal of the Ajman tribe led by Dhaydan bin Hithlain from the battlefield.

The defeat and the death of William Shakespear diminished the relationship between Ibn Saud and the British changing the course of the Arab Revolt against the Ottoman Empire. It also resulted other negative conclusions for Ibn Saud, including a year-long struggle with the Ajman tribe, namely the Battle of Kanzan, and the decrease in his newly emerged prestige.

References

Literature
Travellers in Arabia, Eid Al Yahya, Stacey International (2006).  (9780955219313).
The Historical Journal 14 (3) (September 1971), pp. 627–633.
 H. St. John Philby. (1930). Arabia, London.

1915 in Saudi Arabia
Jarrab
Jarrab